Events in the year 2018 in Kazakhstan.

Incumbents
 President: Nursultan Nazarbayev
 Prime Minister: Bakhytzhan Sagintayev

Events

January 
18 January – A bus fire on the Samara–Shymkent road kills 52 passengers, with five people escaping.

February 
9 – 25 February – Kazakhstan participated in the 2018 Winter Olympics in PyeongChang, South Korea, with 46 competitors in 9 sports.

March 
9 – 18 March – Kazakhstan participated in the 2018 Winter Paralympics in PyeongChang, South Korea.
15 March – A summit of Central Asian leaders takes place in Astana.

October 
 11 October – The flight of the Soyuz MS-10 rocket from Baikonur Cosmodrome to the International Space Station is aborted during launch following the failure of the booster rocket. The two-man crew lands safely near Jezkazgan.

Deaths

17 February – , writer and playwright (b. 1956).

19 July – Denis Ten, figure skater, Olympic bronze medalist (b. 1993).

References

 
2010s in Kazakhstan
Years of the 21st century in Kazakhstan
Kazakhstan
Kazakhstan